The Atlantic is an American magazine and multi-platform publisher. It features articles in the fields of politics, foreign affairs, business and the economy, culture and the arts, technology, and science.

It was founded in 1857 in Boston, as The Atlantic Monthly, a literary and cultural magazine that published leading writers' commentary on education, the abolition of slavery, and other major political issues of that time. Its founders included Francis H. Underwood and prominent writers Ralph Waldo Emerson, Oliver Wendell Holmes Sr., Henry Wadsworth Longfellow, Harriet Beecher Stowe, and John Greenleaf Whittier. James Russell Lowell was its first editor. In addition, The Atlantic Monthly Almanac was an annual almanac published for Atlantic Monthly readers during the 19th and 20th centuries. A change of name was not officially announced when the format first changed from a strict monthly (appearing 12 times a year) to a slightly lower frequency. It was a monthly magazine for 144 years until 2001, when it published 11 issues; it has published 10 issues yearly since 2003. It dropped "Monthly" from the cover beginning with the January/February 2004 issue, and officially changed the name in 2007. 

After experiencing financial hardship and undergoing several ownership changes in the late 20th century, the magazine was purchased by businessman David G. Bradley, who refashioned it as a general editorial magazine primarily aimed at serious national readers and "thought leaders". In 2010, The Atlantic posted its first profit in a decade. In 2016, the periodical was named Magazine of the Year by the American Society of Magazine Editors. In July 2017, Bradley sold a majority interest in the publication to Laurene Powell Jobs's Emerson Collective.

The website's executive editor is Adrienne LaFrance, the editor-in-chief is Jeffrey Goldberg, and the CEO is Nicholas Thompson. The magazine publishes 10 times a year. In 2021 and 2022, its writers won Pulitzer Prizes for feature writing and, in 2022, it won the award for general excellence by the American Society of Magazine Editors.

Early years

In the autumn of 1857, Boston publisher Moses Dresser Phillips created The Atlantic Monthly. This plan was launched in a dinner party, as described in a letter by Phillips:
I must tell you about a little dinner-party I gave about two weeks ago. It would be proper, perhaps, to state the origin of it was a desire to confer with my literary friends on a somewhat extensive literary project, the particulars of which I shall reserve till you come. But to the Party: My invitations included only R. W. Emerson, H. W. Longfellow, J. R. Lowell, Mr. Motley (the 'Dutch Republic' man), O. W. Holmes, Mr. Cabot, and Mr. Underwood, our literary man. Imagine your uncle as the head of such a table, with such guests. The above named were the only ones invited, and they were all present. We sat down at three P.M., and rose at eight. The time occupied was longer by about four hours and thirty minutes than I am in the habit of consuming in that kind of occupation, but it was the richest time intellectually by all odds that I have ever had. Leaving myself and 'literary man' out of the group, I think you will agree with me that it would be difficult to duplicate that number of such conceded scholarship in the whole country besides... Each one is known alike on both sides of the Atlantic, and is read beyond the limits of the English language.

At that dinner he announced his idea for a magazine:
Mr. Cabot is much wiser than I am. Dr. Holmes can write funnier verses than I can. Mr. Motley can write history better than I. Mr. Emerson is a philosopher and I am not. Mr. Lowell knows more of the old poets than I. But none of you knows the American people as well as I do.

The Atlantics first issue was published in November 1857, and quickly gained fame as one of the finest magazines in the English-speaking world.

In 1879, the magazine had offices in Boston's Winthrop Square and at 21 Astor Place in New York City.

Literary history

A leading literary magazine, The Atlantic has published many significant works and authors. It was the first to publish pieces by the abolitionists Julia Ward Howe ("Battle Hymn of the Republic" on February 1, 1862), and William Parker, whose slave narrative, "The Freedman's Story" was published in February and March 1866. It also published Charles W. Eliot's "The New Education", a call for practical reform, that led to his appointment to presidency of Harvard University in 1869; works by Charles Chesnutt before he collected them in The Conjure Woman (1899); and poetry and short stories, helping launch many national literary careers. In 2005, the magazine won a National Magazine Award for fiction.

Editors have recognized major cultural changes and movements. For example, of the emerging writers of the 1920s, Ernest Hemingway had his short story "Fifty Grand" published in the July 1927 edition. Harking back to its abolitionist roots, in its August 1963 edition, at the height of the civil rights movement, the magazine published Martin Luther King Jr.'s defense of civil disobedience, "Letter from Birmingham Jail".

The magazine has published speculative articles that inspired the development of new technologies. The classic example is Vannevar Bush's essay "As We May Think" (July 1945), which inspired Douglas Engelbart and later Ted Nelson to develop the modern workstation and hypertext technology.

The Atlantic Monthly founded the Atlantic Monthly Press in 1917; for many years, it was operated in partnership with Little, Brown and Company. Its published books included Drums Along the Mohawk (1936) and Blue Highways (1982). The press was sold in 1986; today it is an imprint of Grove Atlantic.

In addition to publishing notable fiction and poetry, The Atlantic has emerged in the 21st century as an influential platform for longform storytelling and newsmaker interviews. Influential cover stories have included Anne Marie Slaughter's "Why Women Still Can't Have It All" (2012) and Ta-Nehisi Coates's "A Case for Reparations" (2014). In 2015, Jeffrey Goldberg's "Obama Doctrine" was widely discussed by American media and prompted response by many world leaders.

As of 2022, writers and frequent contributors to the print magazine included James Fallows, Jeffrey Goldberg, Ta-Nehisi Coates, Caitlin Flanagan, Jonathan Rauch, McKay Coppins, Gillian White, Adrienne LaFrance, Vann R. Newkirk II, Derek Thompson, David Frum, Jennifer Senior, George Packer, Ed Yong, and James Parker.

Politics
In 1860, three years into publication, The Atlantics then-editor James Russell Lowell endorsed Republican Abraham Lincoln for his first run for president and also endorsed the abolition of slavery.

In 1964, Edward Weeks wrote on behalf of the editorial board in endorsing Democratic President Lyndon B. Johnson and rebuking Republican Barry Goldwater's candidacy.

In 2016, the editorial board endorsed a presidential candidate, Democratic nominee Hillary Clinton, for the third time since the magazine's founding, in a rebuke of Republican Donald Trump's candidacy. After the 2016 election, the magazine became a strong critic of President Trump. The March 2019 cover article by editor Yoni Appelbaum formally called for the impeachment of Donald Trump: "It's time for Congress to judge the president's fitness to serve." It published a story in September 2020, citing several anonymous sources, reporting that Trump referred to dead American soldiers as "losers". Trump called it a "fake story" and suggested the magazine would soon be out of business.

The Factual noted the Atlantic has "a Left-Center bias and Highly Factual reporting".

Format
On January 22, 2008, TheAtlantic.com dropped its subscriber wall and allowed users to freely browse its site, including all past archives. By 2011 The Atlantics web properties included TheAtlanticWire.com, a news- and opinion-tracking site launched in 2009, and TheAtlanticCities.com, a stand-alone website started in 2011 that was devoted to global cities and trends. According to a Mashable profile in December 2011, "traffic to the three web properties recently surpassed 11 million uniques per month, up a staggering 2500% since The Atlantic brought down its paywall in early 2008."

The Atlantic Wire, the sister site of The Atlantics online presence, TheAtlantic.com, was launched in 2009. It initially served to the purpose of aggregating news and opinions from online, print, radio, and television outlets. At its launch, it published op-eds from across the media spectrum and summarized significant positions in each debate. It later expanded to feature news and original reporting. Regular features included "What I Read," describing the media diets of people from entertainment, journalism, and politics; and "Trimming the Times," the feature editor's summary of the best content in The New York Times. The Atlantic Wire rebranded itself as The Wire in November 2013, and was folded back into The Atlantic the following year.

In December 2011, a new Health Channel launched on TheAtlantic.com, incorporating coverage of food, as well as topics related to the mind, body, sex, family, and public health. Its launch was overseen by Nicholas Jackson, who had previously been overseeing the Life channel and initially joined the website to cover technology. TheAtlantic.com has also expanded to visual storytelling, with the addition of the "In Focus" photo blog, curated by Alan Taylor. In 2011 it created its Video Channel. Initially created as an aggregator, The Atlantics video component, Atlantic Studios, has since evolved in an in-house production studio that creates custom video series and original documentaries.

In 2015, TheAtlantic.com launched a dedicated Science section and in January 2016 it redesigned and expanded its politics section in conjunction with the 2016 U.S. presidential race.

In September 2019, TheAtlantic.com introduced a digital subscription model, restricting unsubscribed readers' access to five free articles per month. The next year, The Atlantic released its first full-length documentary, White Noise, a film about three alt-right activists.

Aspen Ideas Festival 

In 2005, The Atlantic and the Aspen Institute launched the Aspen Ideas Festival, a ten-day event in and around the city of Aspen, Colorado. The annual conference features 350 presenters, 200 sessions, and 3,000 attendees. The event has been called a "political who's who" as it often features policymakers, journalists, lobbyists, and think tank leaders.

CityLab 

CityLab was launched in September 2011 as The Atlantic Cities. Its co-founders included Richard Florida, urban theorist and professor. The stand-alone site has been described as exploring and explaining "the most innovative ideas and pressing issues facing today's global cities and neighborhoods." In 2014, it was rebranded as CityLab.com. CityLab.com covers transportation, environment, equity, life, and design. Among its offerings are Navigator, "a guide to urban life"; and Solutions, which covers solutions to problems in a dozen topics.

In 2015, CityLab and Univision launched CityLab Latino, which features original journalism in Spanish as well as translated reporting from the English language edition of CityLab.com. The site was last updated in 2018.

In early December 2019, Atlantic Media sold CityLab to Bloomberg Media, which promptly laid off half the staff. The site was relaunched on June 18, 2020, with few major changes other than new branding and linking the site with other Bloomberg verticals and its data terminal.

Praise and retractions
In June 2006, the Chicago Tribune named The Atlantic one of the top ten English-language magazines, describing it as the "150-year-old granddaddy of periodicals" because "it keeps us smart and in the know" with cover stories on the then-forthcoming fight over Roe v. Wade. It also lauded regular features such as "Word Fugitives" and "Primary Sources" as "cultural barometers".

On January 14, 2013, The Atlantics website published "sponsor content" promoting David Miscavige, the leader of the Church of Scientology. While the magazine had previously published advertising looking like articles, this was widely criticized. The page comments were moderated by the marketing team, not by editorial staff, and comments critical of the church were being removed. Later that day, The Atlantic removed the piece from its website and issued an apology.

In 2019, the magazine published an expose on the allegations against movie director Bryan Singer that "sent Singer's career into a tailspin". It was originally contracted to Esquire magazine, but the writers moved it there due to what New York Times reporter Ben Smith described as Hearst magazines' "timid" nature. "There's not a lot of nuance here", Jeffrey Goldberg said. "They spiked a story that should have been published in the public interest for reasons unknown."

On November 1, 2020, The Atlantic retracted an article ("The Mad, Mad World of Niche Sports Among Ivy League–Obsessed Parents") after a Washington Post inquiry. An 800-word Editor's Note said, "We cannot attest to the trustworthiness and credibility of the author, and therefore we cannot attest to the veracity of the article." The article's author, freelancer Ruth Shalit Barrett, had left the staff of The New Republic in 1999 amid allegations of plagiarism.

Ownership

By its third year, it was published by the noted Boston publishing house Ticknor and Fields (later to become part of Houghton Mifflin), based in the city known for literary culture. The magazine was purchased in 1908 by its then editor, Ellery Sedgwick, but remained in Boston.

In 1980, the magazine was acquired by Mortimer Zuckerman, property magnate and founder of Boston Properties, who became its chairman. On September 27, 1999, Zuckerman transferred ownership of the magazine to David G. Bradley, owner of the National Journal Group, which focused on news of Washington, D.C., and government. Bradley had promised that the magazine would stay in Boston for the foreseeable future, as it did for the next five-and-a-half years.

In April 2005, however, the publishers announced that the editorial offices would be moved from their longtime home at 77 North Washington Street in Boston to join the company's advertising and circulation divisions in Washington, D.C. Later in August, Bradley told The New York Observer that the move was not made to save money—near-term savings would be $200,000–$300,000, a relatively small amount that would be swallowed by severance-related spending—but instead would serve to create a hub in Washington where the top minds from all of Bradley's publications could collaborate under the Atlantic Media Company umbrella. Few of the Boston staff agreed to move, and Bradley embarked on an open search for a new editorial staff.

In 2006, Bradley hired James Bennet as editor-in-chief; he had been the Jerusalem bureau chief for The New York Times. He also hired writers, including Jeffrey Goldberg and Andrew Sullivan. Jay Lauf joined the organization as publisher and vice-president in 2008; as of 2017, he was publisher and president of Quartz.

Bennet and Bob Cohn became co-presidents of The Atlantic in early 2014, and Cohn became the publication's sole president in March 2016 when Bennet was tapped to lead The New York Timess editorial page. Jeffrey Goldberg was named editor-in-chief in October 2016.

On July 28, 2017, The Atlantic announced that billionaire investor and philanthropist Laurene Powell Jobs (the widow of former Apple Inc. chairman and CEO Steve Jobs) had acquired majority ownership through her Emerson Collective organization, with a staff member of Emerson Collective, Peter Lattman, being immediately named as vice chairman of The Atlantic. David G. Bradley and Atlantic Media retained a minority share position in this sale.

List of editors

 James Russell Lowell, 1857–1861
 James T. Fields, 1861–1871
 William Dean Howells, 1871–1881
 Thomas Bailey Aldrich, 1881–1890
 Horace Scudder, 1890–1898
 Walter Hines Page, 1898–99
 Bliss Perry, 1899–1909
 Ellery Sedgwick, 1909–1938
 Edward A. Weeks, 1938–1966
 Robert Manning, 1966–1980
 William Whitworth, 1980–1999
 Michael Kelly, 1999–2003
 Cullen Murphy, 2003–2006 (interim editor, never named editor-in-chief)
 James Bennet, 2006–2016
 Jeffrey Goldberg, 2016–present

See also

References

External links

 
 "A History of The Atlantic
 The Atlantic archival writings by topic
 archive.org Online archive of The Atlantic (earliest issues 1857 up to 2016)
 Hathi Trust. Atlantic Monthly digitized issues, 1857–
 An early history of The Atlantic from The Literary Digest (1897)
 Atlantic Monthly records, at the University of Maryland libraries

1857 establishments in Massachusetts
Literary magazines published in the United States
Monthly magazines published in the United States
News magazines published in the United States
Political magazines published in the United States
 
Magazines established in 1857
Magazines published in Boston
Magazines published in Washington, D.C.
Lifestyle magazines published in the United States